Harry C. Bradley (April 15, 1869 – October 18, 1947) was an American film actor. He appeared in more than 200 films between 1930 and 1946.

Selected filmography

 Roadhouse Nights (1930) - Hotel Desk Clerk (uncredited)
 The Smiling Lieutenant (1931) - Count Von Halden (uncredited)
 The Dark Horse (1932) - Blue Ribbon Man (uncredited)
 Beauty Parlor (1932) - Henry Mason
 Skyscraper Souls (1932) - Johnson, Dwight's Secretary (uncredited)
 American Madness (1932) - Sampson (uncredited)
 70,000 Witnesses (1932) - Train Conductor (uncredited)
 Prosperity (1932) - Man Whose Pants Need Mending (uncredited)
 The Kid from Spain (1932) - Man in Line at Mexican Border (uncredited)
 If I Had a Million (1932) - Uniformed Bank Guard (uncredited)
 Silver Dollar (1932) - Messenger (uncredited)
 The Billion Dollar Scandal (1933) - Minister (uncredited)
 Employees' Entrance (1933) - Employee Who Refuses Paycut (uncredited)
 Parachute Jumper (1933) - Man in Society for Prohibition Enforcement Office (uncredited)
 Luxury Liner (1933) - Ship's Tailor (uncredited)
 Ladies They Talk About (1933) - Attendee at Revival Meeting (uncredited)
 Mystery of the Wax Museum (1933) - Reporter (uncredited)
 Grand Slam (1933) - Bridge Match Referee (uncredited)
 Girl Missing (1933) - Station Master (uncredited)
 The Little Giant (1933) - Harry S. Winter (uncredited)
 Central Airport (1933) - Doctor (uncredited)
 The Working Man (1933) - Reeves Co. Board Member (uncredited)
 I Have Lived (1933) - Clergyman (uncredited)
 Melody Cruise (1933) - Ship Passenger (uncredited)
 I Love That Man (1933) - Prison Chaplain (uncredited)
 The Stranger's Return (1933) - Dr. Rizzell (uncredited)
 This Day and Age (1933) - Mr. Smith (uncredited)
 Lady for a Day (1933) - Lloyd - Hotel Mail Clerk (uncredited)
 Bureau of Missing Persons (1933) - Mr. Newberry (uncredited)
 The Prizefighter and the Lady (1933) - Bar Patron #4 (uncredited)
 Sitting Pretty (1933) - Set Designer (uncredited)
 Dancing Lady (1933) - Pinky's Pal (uncredited)
 Lone Cowboy (1933) - First Station Agent (uncredited)
 Lady Killer (1933) - Man with Purse (uncredited)
 Convention City (1933) - Graham
 The Big Shakedown (1934) - Third Drug Store Proprietor (uncredited)
 Cross Country Cruise (1934) - First Dodd's Salesman (uncredited)
 Caravan (1934) - Priest (uncredited)
 Mandalay (1934) - Henry P. Warren (uncredited)
 As the Earth Turns (1934) - Elder (uncredited)
 It Happened One Night (1934) - Henderson (uncredited)
 Heat Lightning (1934) - 'Popsy' - a Businessman
 Men in White (1934) - Minister (uncredited)
 House of Mystery (1934) - Prof. Horatio Potter
 City Limits (1934) - Dr. Stafford
 The Line-Up (1934) - Mr. Hamilton (uncredited)
 The Last Gentleman (1934) - Professor Schumaker (uncredited)
 Sadie McKee (1934) - Dr. Taylor - with Dr. Briggs (uncredited)
 Change of Heart (1934) - Graduation Speaker (uncredited)
 Hell Bent for Love (1934) - Professor
 The Merry Frinks (1934) - Dr. Shinliver
 Now I'll Tell (1934) - Judge Farth (uncredited)
 Call It Luck (1934) - Herman Gideon (uncredited)
 Fifteen Wives (1934) - Davis - Hotel Manager
 Beyond the Law (1934) - Professor Bennett
 Our Daily Bread (1934) - Professor (uncredited)
 The Human Side (1934) - Justice of the Peace (uncredited)
 Among the Missing (1934) - Alvin Abbott
 Tomorrow's Youth (1934) - School Principal (uncredited)
 Lady by Choice (1934) - Bradley - Court Clerk (uncredited)
 Cheating Cheaters (1934) - Hanley (uncredited)
 Kid Millions (1934) - Bartender (uncredited)
 Broadway Bill (1934) - Morgan's Bookkeeper (uncredited)
 White Lies (1934) - Davis (uncredited)
 Biography of a Bachelor Girl (1935) - Davison (uncredited)
 A Night at the Ritz (1935) - Dining Banker (uncredited)
 Living on Velvet (1935) - Talkative Man at Party (uncredited)
 Private Worlds (1935) - Johnson's father
 It Happened in New York (1935) - Theatre Manager (uncredited)
 Baby Face Harrington (1935) - Bank Cashier (uncredited)
 Love in Bloom (1935) - Sexton (uncredited)
 Stranded (1935) - Train Conductor (uncredited)
 Front Page Woman (1935) - Jury Foreman (uncredited)
 Woman Wanted (1935) - Third Juror Talking to Mike (uncredited)
 Man on the Flying Trapeze (1935) - Passing Motorist (uncredited)
 China Seas (1935) - Ship's Passenger (uncredited)
 Diamond Jim (1935) - Brady's Secretary (uncredited)
 I Live My Life (1935) - Museum Curator (uncredited)
 This Is the Life (1935) - Dr. Dudley - Sunday School Picnic Minister (uncredited)
 Way Down East (1935) - Mr. Peabody
 Personal Maid's Secret (1935) - Candlesticks Salesman (uncredited)
 1,000 Dollars a Minute (1935) - Dr. Cromley (uncredited)
 Rendezvous (1935) - Cashier (uncredited)
 Thanks a Million (1935) - Father (uncredited)
 Stars Over Broadway (1935) - Man in Church (uncredited)
 Ah, Wilderness! (1935) - Minor Role - Scenes Deleted (uncredited)
 Millions in the Air (1935) - Mr. Waldo-Walker
 Riffraff (1936) - Minister at Wedding (uncredited)
 Strike Me Pink (1936) - Club Lido Patron (uncredited)
 Dancing Feet (1936) - Hotel Assistant Manager
 Next Time We Love (1936) - Desk Clerk (uncredited)
 Hell-Ship Morgan (1936) - Minister
 Don't Get Personal (1936) - Foreman (uncredited)
 It Had to Happen (1936) - Beatrice's Secretary (scenes deleted)
 The Country Doctor (1936) - Clergyman (uncredited)
 Mr. Deeds Goes to Town (1936) - Anderson (uncredited)
 Florida Special (1936) - Conductor (uncredited)
 Three of a Kind (1936) - Mr. Fash
 Parole! (1936) - Dr. Arthur Carroll (uncredited)
 Trapped by Television (1936) - Telephone Man (uncredited)
 We Went to College (1936) - Sightseeing Alumnus (uncredited)
 Rhythm on the Range (1936) - Minister (uncredited)
 Yours for the Asking (1936) - Art Dealer (uncredited)
 The Gorgeous Hussy (1936) - President's Secretary (uncredited)
 Wives Never Know (1936) - Justice of the Peace (uncredited)
 Murder with Pictures (1936) - Gas Station Attendant (uncredited)
 Cain and Mabel (1936) - Man in Library (uncredited)
 Wedding Present (1936) - Ticket Seller (uncredited)
 Libeled Lady (1936) - Justice of the Peace (uncredited)
 The Public Pays (1936, Short) - Grocer (uncredited)
 All American Chump (1936) - Prof. Spring (uncredited)
 Come and Get It (1936) - Thomas Gubbins (uncredited)
 Easy to Take (1936) - Relative (uncredited)
 The Accusing Finger (1936) - Senator (uncredited)
 Gold Diggers of 1937 (1936) - Dr. Henry
 Girl Overboard (1937) - Mr. Ainsley (uncredited)
 Sing While You're Able (1937) - C. William Williams
 A Star Is Born (1937) - Niles' Assistant (uncredited)
 Let Them Live (1937) - Train Conductor (uncredited)
 The Road Back (1937) - Forman / Porter (uncredited)
 Riding on Air (1937) - Mayor
 Ever Since Eve (1937) - Purity League Manager (uncredited)
 New Faces of 1937 (1937) - Count Moody's Secretary
 Marry the Girl (1937) - Patient with Fife (uncredited)
 Broadway Melody of 1938 (1937) - Bertram (uncredited)
 Partners in Crime (1937) - Committee Man (uncredited)
 Trouble at Midnight (1937) - Doctor
 The Jury's Secret (1938) - Jury Foreman (uncredited)
 When G-Men Step In (1938) - Mr. Drake (uncredited)
 International Crime (1938) - Barrows
 Women Are Like That (1938) - Mr. Frazier - the Divorce Lawyer (uncredited)
 Little Miss Broadway (1938) - Club Secretary (uncredited)
 Letter of Introduction (1938) - Minor Role (uncredited)
 I Am the Law (1938) - Mr. Higgins - Witness (uncredited)
 The Lady Objects (1938) - Prof. Fenner (uncredited)
 The Little Adventuress (1938) - Henry Lowell
 Inside Story (1939) - Conductor (uncredited)
 Panama Patrol (1939) - Clerk (uncredited)
 Let Us Live (1939) - Hijacked Motorist (uncredited)
 East Side of Heaven (1939) - James Travers (uncredited)
 The Kid from Texas (1939) - Appleby - on Telephone (voice, uncredited)
 Should Husbands Work? (1939) - Snodgrass
 I Stole a Million (1939) - Sexton (uncredited)
 When Tomorrow Comes (1939) - Reverend Mr. Morris (uncredited)
 Our Leading Citizen (1939) - Director
 The Star Maker (1939) - Conductor
 Mr. Smith Goes to Washington (1939) - Arthur Kim (uncredited)
 The Roaring Twenties (1939) - Restaurant Patron (uncredited)
 His Girl Friday (1940) - Insurance Doctor (uncredited)
 City of Chance (1940) - Gambling House Patron (uncredited)
 Danger on Wheels (1940) - Jones
 Road to Singapore (1940) - Secretary (uncredited)
 Flash Gordon Conquers the Universe (1940, Serial) - Keedish [Chs. 6-7]
 The Doctor Takes a Wife (1940) - Dapper Salesman (uncredited)
 Edison, the Man (1940) - Preacher (uncredited)
 Those Were the Days! (1940) - Conductor (uncredited)
 Queen of the Mob (1940) - Lawyer
 Stranger on the Third Floor (1940) - Court Clerk (uncredited)
 Spring Parade (1940) - Mandate (uncredited)
 The Ape (1940) - Quinn (uncredited)
 Slightly Tempted (1940) - Cartwright
 One Night in the Tropics (1940) - Mr. Moore's Doctor (uncredited)
 Life with Henry (1940) - Business Man (uncredited)
 Behind the News (1940) - Justice of the Peace (uncredited)
 The Invisible Woman (1940) - Want-Ad Clerk (uncredited)
 Golden Hoofs (1941) - Critt (uncredited)
 The Monster and the Girl (1941) - Rev. Russell (uncredited)
 Men of Boys Town (1941) - Senior Minister (scenes deleted)
 The Black Cat (1941) - Coroner (uncredited)
 They Dare Not Love (1941) - Army Officer (uncredited)
 Blondie in Society (1941) - Angry Neighbor With Petunia Beds (uncredited)
 The Big Store (1941) - Henry (uncredited)
 Sweetheart of the Campus (1941) - The Judge (uncredited)
 Hello, Sucker (1941) - Galloway (uncredited)
 Mystery Ship (1941) - Apartment Manager (uncredited)
 Buy Me That Town (1941) - Reverend Brooks
 The Stork Pays Off (1941) - Mr. Dennison (uncredited)
 New York Town (1941) - Spectator (uncredited)
 Tillie the Toiler (1941)
 Blondie Goes to College (1942) - Professor
 Frisco Lil (1942) - Judge
 Sing Your Worries Away (1942) - Justice of the Peace (uncredited)
 Yokel Boy (1942) - Minister (uncredited)
 Hi, Neighbor (1942) - Minister (uncredited)
 The Gay Sisters (1942) - Records Clerk (uncredited)
 Busses Roar (1942) - Henry Dipper
 Get Hep to Love (1942) - Music Judge (uncredited)
 Mrs. Wiggs of the Cabbage Patch (1942) - Minister (uncredited)
 The Payoff (1942) - Dr. Steele
 They Got Me Covered (1943) - Singing Hotel Waiter (uncredited)
 Hangmen Also Die! (1943) - Townsman (uncredited)
 Family Troubles (1943, Short) - Mr. Tom Jones
 Henry Aldrich Gets Glamour (1943) - Mr. Japes (uncredited)
 Dixie (1943) - Publisher (uncredited)
 Someone to Remember (1943) - College Trustee (uncredited)
 Top Man (1943) - Teacher (uncredited)
 Princess O'Rourke (1943) - Matilda's Husband (uncredited)
 Girl Crazy (1943) - Governor's Crony (uncredited)
 Knickerbocker Holiday (1944) - Councilman (uncredited)
 Her Primitive Man (1944) - Lecture Attendee (uncredited)
 Henry Aldrich Plays Cupid (1944) - Teacher (uncredited)
 Mr. Skeffington (1944) - Rector (uncredited)
 Make Your Own Bed (1944) - Mr. Brookin (uncredited)
 Henry Aldrich's Little Secret (1944) - Mr. Tottle
 Bowery to Broadway (1944) - Reformer (uncredited)
 And Now Tomorrow (1944) - Episcopalian Minister (uncredited)
 The Town Went Wild (1944) - Mr. Wilson, Marriage License Clerk (uncredited)
 Belle of the Yukon (1944) - Saloon Patron with Hat (uncredited)
 Youth on Trial (1945) - Motor Court Manager (uncredited)
 Wife Wanted (1946) - Friendship Club Victim (uncredited)

References

External links

1869 births
1947 deaths
20th-century American male actors
American male film actors
Male actors from San Francisco